Hypsopygia nitidicilialis is a species of snout moth in the genus Hypsopygia. It was described by Hering in 1901. It is found on Sumatra.

References

Moths described in 1901
Pyralini